In mathematics, topological -theory is a branch of algebraic topology. It was founded to study vector bundles on topological spaces, by means of ideas now recognised as (general) K-theory that were introduced by Alexander Grothendieck. The early work on topological -theory is due to Michael Atiyah and Friedrich Hirzebruch.

Definitions 
Then  is defined to be the Grothendieck group of the commutative monoid of isomorphism classes of finite-dimensional -vector bundles over  under Whitney sum. Tensor product of bundles gives -theory a commutative ring structure. The remaining discussion is focused on complex -theory.

As a first example, note that the -theory of a point is the integers. This is because vector bundles over a point are trivial and thus classified by their rank and the Grothendieck group of the natural numbers is the integers.

There is also a reduced version of -theory, defined for  a compact pointed space (cf. reduced homology). This reduced theory is intuitively  modulo trivial bundles. It is defined as the group of stable equivalence classes of bundles. This equivalence relation results in a group since every vector bundle can be completed to a trivial bundle by summing with its orthogonal complement. Alternatively,  can be defined as the kernel of the map  induced by the inclusion of the base point  into .

-theory forms a multiplicative (generalized) cohomology theory as follows. The short exact sequence of a pair of pointed spaces 

extends to a long exact sequence

Let  be the -th reduced suspension of a space and then define

Negative indices are chosen so that the coboundary maps increase dimension.

It is often useful to have an unreduced version of these groups, simply by defining:

Finally, the Bott periodicity theorem as formulated below extends the theories to positive integers.

Properties 
  (respectively) is a contravariant functor from the homotopy category of (pointed) spaces to the category of commutative rings. Thus, for instance, the -theory over contractible spaces is always 
 There is a natural ring homomorphism  the Chern character, such that  is an isomorphism.
 The equivalent of the Steenrod operations in -theory are the Adams operations. They can be used to define characteristic classes in topological -theory.
 The Splitting principle of topological -theory allows one to reduce statements about arbitrary vector bundles to statements about sums of line bundles.
This holds whenever  is a spin-bundle.
 The Atiyah-Hirzebruch spectral sequence allows computation of -groups from ordinary cohomology groups.
 Topological -theory can be generalized vastly to a functor on C*-algebras, see operator K-theory and KK-theory.

Bott periodicity 
The phenomenon of periodicity named after Raoul Bott (see Bott periodicity theorem) can be formulated this way:

  and  where H is the class of the tautological bundle on  i.e. the Riemann sphere.
 
 

In real -theory there is a similar periodicity, but modulo 8.

Applications 
The two most famous applications of topological -theory are both due to Frank Adams. First he solved the Hopf invariant one problem by doing a computation with his Adams operations. Then he proved an upper bound for the number of linearly independent vector fields on spheres.

Chern character 
Michael Atiyah and Friedrich Hirzebruch proved a theorem relating the topological K-theory of a finite CW complex  with its rational cohomology. In particular, they showed that there exists a homomorphism

such that

There is an algebraic analogue relating the Grothendieck group of coherent sheaves and the Chow ring of a smooth projective variety .

See also
Atiyah–Hirzebruch spectral sequence (computational tool for finding K-theory groups)
KR-theory
Atiyah–Singer index theorem
Snaith's theorem
Algebraic K-theory

References

 
 
 
 
 
 

K-theory